Jamie Blanks (born 29 November 1971) is an Australian film director and composer. He directed the cult slasher films Urban Legend (1998) and Valentine (2001). He later directed the horror films Storm Warning (2007) and Long Weekend (2008).

Biography
He attended film school at Melbourne's Swinburne Film School (becoming the Victorian College of the Arts during his three years of study).

The path to landing the directing gig on Urban Legend began with Blanks receiving the screenplay for Scream – called ‘Scary Movie’ at the time – from a manager who had seen his student film.

“I didn’t get the job, obviously, because I was well outgunned by Wes Craven – deservedly so because he is the master,” says Blanks. “Then I got the screenplay for I Know What You Did Last Summer, also by Kevin Williamson, and I thought the only way I could convince producers in Hollywood that I’m capable of making a film is to take the screenplay and try to direct a couple of scenes. Then I had a better idea, which was to make a trailer – shoot all the money shots, all the things that would sell this movie. And that’s what I did with $3,000 and a whole bunch of friends.

“We shot it on 35mm and it turned out really well. I sent it over to the producer, who was ready to hire me on the film, but the ink had already dried on the director’s contract – they hired Jim Gillespie to direct that movie. But they said ‘don’t worry, we’ll find a film for you to direct’ and true to their word, nine months later I was offered Urban Legend based on the strength of that one trailer and student film.”

Blanks credits Phoenix Pictures, producer Neal Moritz and his team for taking a chance and providing him with the opportunity, despite his limited experience. “I think they responded to the fact that I loved the genre.

Blanks gave commentaries on the Urban Legend and Valentine (2001) DVDs. His third feature Storm Warning won awards for Special Effects and Score at Screamfest 2007. Blanks shot, edited and composed the score for his fourth feature, Long Weekend (released on video in the United States as Nature's Grave), starring Jim Caviezel and Claudia Karvan, which was released in 2008.

Selected filmography

Silent Number
Silent Number was Jamie Blanks' first film. The film revolves around a babysitter as she spends the night at a creepy house during an electrical storm. During the night, she receives a number of telephone calls from an unidentified caller. The voice sounds scared and pleads the babysitter for help. We eventually discover the calls are not coming from any normal source.

Silent Number is available to view on YouTube and can be viewed on-site at the VCA library in Melbourne, Australia. It may also be available for viewing at some other libraries.

Director
Silent Number (1993)
Urban Legend (1998)
Valentine (2001)
Storm Warning (2007)
Long Weekend (2008)

Composer
The Abbarant (1991)
Storm Warning (2007)
Long Weekend (2008)
Machete Maidens Unleashed! (2010)
Needle (2010)
Crawlspace (2012)

References

External links

James Blanks on Twitter
Silent Number (short film) on YouTube

Living people
Australian film directors
Place of birth missing (living people)
Horror film directors
1971 births